The Musée de la Mer is a museum located in Gorée, Senegal. The museum contains various documents and photos on marine animals in Senegal with a collection of 6,000 species.

References

See also 
 List of museums in Senegal

Museums in Senegal
Gorée